Nador West Med is a planned deep water port, to be located about 30 km from Nador, Morocco. In 2016, a consortium consisting of STFA Group, the Société générale des travaux du Maroc (SGTM) and Jan De Nul were selected to build the infrastructure at a projected cost of 7,61 billion dirhams (roughly 800 M$). Construction was originally supposed to last 5 years but is now scheduled to be complete by late 2022 with an opening in 2024.

References

External links 
 

Ports and harbours of Morocco
Nador